Priles may refer to:

 Príles, a section of Trenčianska Teplá, Slovakia
 Priles, Croatia, a village near Sveti Đurđ, Croatia